Bikinia is a genus of flowering plants in the family Fabaceae. It belongs to the subfamily Detarioideae.

Species
Species accepted by the Plants of the World Online as of February 2021:

Bikinia aciculifera 
Bikinia breynei 
Bikinia congensis 
Bikinia coriacea 
Bikinia durandii 
Bikinia evrardii 
Bikinia grisea 
Bikinia letestui 
Bikinia media 
Bikinia pellegrinii

References

Detarioideae
Fabaceae genera